Technical High Schools (T.H.S) is trade school at Payyoli, Kozhikode, Kerala.

History 

Technical High Schools (T.H.S) of Kerala, originally known as Junior Technical Schools (J.T.S) were started 1960-61.

About T.H.S Payyoli
Govt.of Kerala under the control of Technical Education started Technical High Schools to impart trade level technical education in the High school level. The children above 12 years who are talented in the field of Engineering are admitted to 8th std in T.H.S, based on an entrance examination. A student who passes T.H.S are awarded technical high school leaving certificate(T.H.S.L.C) including a trade certificate. Apart from studies in general schools, it envisages to develop trade skills for the students by promptly training them in their trade through Engineering subjects, Workshop practicals along with general subjects. Our school offers training in four Trades Electronics, Welding, Fitting and Motor Mechanic. The school has won so many item of sports and arts

Educational institutions established in 1983
Schools in Kozhikode district